Spreading the Disease is the second studio album by the American heavy metal band Anthrax, released on October 30, 1985 by Megaforce Records and Island Records. It was the band's first album to feature vocalist Joey Belladonna and bassist Frank Bello. A special two-disc edition of the album was released in 2015, celebrating its 30th anniversary.

Background and writing
After Anthrax finished touring in support of Fistful of Metal, vocalist Neil Turbin was expelled from the band. Matt Fallon replaced him, but was quickly fired because he lacked confidence in the studio. Producer Carl Canedy suggested the group to audition Joey Belladonna, who was not familiar with thrash metal. Though the band members were not pleased with Belladonna's musical background, they hired him and booked a few shows with their new frontman. Spreading the Disease was recorded at the Pyramid Sound Studios in Ithaca, New York with Canedy, while Jon Zazula served as executive producer. The album featured the single "Madhouse", for which a music video was produced, but it did not receive much airplay on MTV, because the station believed the content was degrading to the mentally insane. Spreading the Disease was the band's major label debut and was released by Megaforce / Island Records.

This was the last Anthrax album to feature songwriting from Turbin. This was also the first to feature songwriting from bassist Dan Lilker after his departure from the band, though more of his songwriting would be featured on the following album, Among the Living. Turbin wrote the lyrics for "Armed and Dangerous" and "Gung-Ho", and Lilker contributed to the music. Zazula was given songwriting credit for "Medusa", his only contribution for Anthrax. Zazula was originally credited as the sole writer of the song, but album reissues credit the rest of the band as well. Additionally former vocalist Matt Fallon who left during the recording sessions claimed in a 2016 interview that he contributed to the lyrics but was left uncredited. The band has not commented on these accusations.

After recording the album was completed, guitarist Scott Ian, drummer Charlie Benante and Lilker, who had joined Nuclear Assault, founded the Stormtroopers of Death and recorded the album Speak English or Die, a milestone in crossover thrash. 

In his autobiography, I'm the Man: The Story of That Guy from Anthrax (2014: 91), Scott Ian said the acronym in the song "A.I.R." stands for "Adolescence in Red" and that it was a wordplay of his on George Gershwin's Rhapsody in Blue.

Cover art
The cover art was made by Peter Corriston and Dave Heffernon, who had worked on Led Zeppelin's Physical Graffiti sleeve. Benante came up with the concept of a man being investigated for radiation levels. It is said that he deliberately made the man have a strong resemblance to his nephew and bassist Frank Bello as an in-joke, although they have neither confirmed nor denied this.

Reception

Spreading the Disease was released on October 30, 1985 and received widespread acclaim by music critics. In a contemporary review, Howard Johnson of the British magazine Kerrang! recommended the album as the best example of thrash metal around and equaled Anthrax to Metallica in the craft of writing great songs.

Modern reviews are also very positive. AllMusic's Steve Huey said the album was a great leap forward from its predecessor and one of Anthrax's finest. He praised the lyrics for paying tribute to fictional characters as in "Lone Justice" and "Medusa". Canadian journalist Martin Popoff calls the album "a shocking blast of noise from a long-haired bunch of punks that knew their own business", praising the "deceptively chaotic songcraft" and Belladonna's vocals. Sputnikmusic's Mike Stagno also liked Belladonna's vocals, as well as the tight riffs of guitarists Ian and Spitz. Stagno said Spreading the Disease had excellent sound and production and recommended the album for fans of thrash metal. Frank Trojan of Rock Hard wrote that Spreading the Disease had more potential and intelligence than Fistful of Metal, as well as more differentiated songs. British author Joel McIver described Spreading the Disease as "the sound of pure determination, at a point in metal history where boundaries were being pushed every day."

Track listing

Personnel
Credits are adapted from the album's liner notes.

Anthrax
 Joey Belladonna – lead vocals
 Dan Spitz – lead and rhythm guitar, backing vocals
 Scott Ian – rhythm and lead guitar, backing vocals
 Frank Bello – bass, backing vocals
 Charlie Benante – drums

Production
 Jon Zazula – executive producer
 Carl Canedy – producer, assistant engineer
 Alex Perialas – engineer
 Norman Dunn – assistant engineer

Charts

References

External links

1985 albums
Anthrax (American band) albums
Island Records albums
Megaforce Records albums